The 12 ft Skiff is a development dinghy class dating back to the early 20th century. It is sailed in Australia and New Zealand. Both the crew and the helm are able to use the trapeze at the same time. It has an asymmetrical spinnaker and a jib, in addition to the mainsail.

History
The origin of the 12 ft Skiff is dubious, but it is thought to have roots in the smaller skiffs sailed on Sydney Harbour in the late 1800s. The skiff became a class in its own right in 1926 when, at a meeting between Lane Cove 12ft Sailing Skiff Club, Greenwich 12 ft Flying Squadron, The Spit 12 ft Skiff Sailing Club and Vaucluse Amateur 12 ft Sailing Skiff Club,  the 12 ft Sailing Skiff Council was formed. At this time the skiff was manned by a crew of five, but around the 1940s it changed to a three-man boat, and then became the two man boat that is used today. In 1947 the Council changed its name to the NSW 12 ft Sailing Skiff Association. After the 1940s the skiff went international.

Design 

 Overall length 3.7 metres
 Beam 1.8 metres
 Crewed by two people, both on trapeze
 Light weight 45 kilogram hull
 Sail area and rig design are unlimited
 Mast height is unlimited but can be up to 8.8 metres
 Most boats have three complete rigs (small, medium, large)
 Each skiff is individual, not an off the shelf product
 Simple measurement rules allow design development
 The asymmetrical spinnaker is set off a fixed bowsprit

Sailing and racing 
Today the 12 ft Skiff is primarily sailed in Australia and New Zealand.

Campaigning a 12 requires a range of skills, including boat handling, tuning, boat maintenance, organisation and training. However, with recent equipment developments, and the introduction of carbon masts, 12 ft Skiffs are very manageable boats and any sailor with relative experience, such as Cherubs or Moths, would quite easily adapt.

Performance
The 12 ft Skiff is similar to the larger and better known 18ft Skiff. Of all skiffs the 12 footer is known for being the most difficult to sail, primarily due to its short and narrow hull relative to its large sail area.

The 12 ft Skiff generates considerable power by having two persons on the trapeze wire, suspended from the mast of the boat. This adds leverage to the crews' weight, allowing the larger areas of sail to be carried.

The modern 12 ft Skiffs also have fixed bowsprits from which they carry their spinnakers. This is a relatively recent innovation, with the older style of skiff having an 'end to end' spinnaker pole which would need to be positioned by the crew, and would be stored against the skiff's boom when it was not being used.

Regattas

Australia 
 New South Wales State Championship "The Morna Cup"
 Queensland State Championship 
 Australia Championship "Norman Booth Trophy"

New Zealand 

 New Zealand team trials
 New Zealand National Championship

International 

 Interdominon Championship "Silasec Trophy"

References

External links 

 Australian 12 Foot Skiff Association Site
 New Zealand 12 Foot Skiff Association Site
 Sydney Flying Squadron
 Lane Cove 12 Foot Skiff Sailing Club
 Abbotsford 12 Foot Skiff Flying Squadron
 Flickr 12 Foot Skiff Photos

Dinghies